HD 190228 is a star with a non-stellar companion in the constellation Vulpecula. Its apparent magnitude is 7.30 – too faint to be seen with the naked eye – and the absolute magnitude is 3.34. Based on parallax measurements, it is located at a distance of 205 light years from the Sun. The star is older than the Sun with an age over 5 billion years and it is metal-poor.

In 2000, it was announced that a giant planet was orbiting the star with a minimum mass of 5 Jupiter masses, designated HD 190228 b. The planetary nature of the object was questioned because of the low metal content of the star: giant planets are more likely to be found around high-metallicity stars, so it was argued that the object was more likely to be a brown dwarf. Later astrometric measurements confirmed this: HD 190228 b is in fact a brown dwarf of 49.4 Jupiter masses in a nearly face-on orbit. The brown dwarf takes 1146 days to orbit the star, and the orbit is elliptical with an eccentricity of 0.5. A 2022 study estimated a much lower true mass, close to the minimum mass, but notes that their inclination measurement is not well constrained.

References

G-type subgiants
Brown dwarfs
Vulpecula
Durchmusterung objects
190228
098714